Eloise Jarvis McGraw (December 9, 1915 – November 30, 2000) was an American author of children's books and young adult novels.

Career 
McGraw also contributed to the Oz series started by L. Frank Baum; working with her daughter, graphic artist and librarian Lauren Lynn McGraw (Wagner), she wrote Merry Go Round in Oz (the last of the Oz books issued by Baum's publisher) and The Forbidden Fountain of Oz.  The actual writing of the books was done entirely by Eloise; Lauren made story contributions significant enough for Eloise to assign her co-authorship credit. McGraw's The Rundelstone of Oz was published in 2000 without a credit to her daughter.

Author Gina Wickwar credited McGraw with help in the editing of her book The Hidden Prince of Oz (2000).

Awards 
She was awarded the Newbery Honor three times in three different decades, for her novels Moccasin Trail (1952), The Golden Goblet (1962), and The Moorchild (1997). A Really Weird Summer (1977) won an Edgar Award for Best Juvenile Mystery from the Mystery Writers of America, as later did Tangled Web (1994). McGraw had a very strong interest in history, and among the many books she wrote for children are Greensleeves, The Seventeenth Swap, The Striped Ships and Mara, Daughter of the Nile. A Lewis Carroll Shelf Award was given to Moccasin Trail in 1963.

Personal life 
McGraw lived for many years in Portland, Oregon before dying in late 2000 of "complications of cancer." She was married to William Corbin McGraw, who died in 1999. They had two children, Peter and Lauren.

Bibliography 
 (originally copyright 1952)

 (originally copyright 1950)
The Seventeenth Swap (1986)
Greensleeves, Harcourt, 1968
The Trouble With Jacob
Mara, Daughter of the Nile - Coward, 1953
The Golden Goblet, Coward, 1961

Merry Go Round in Oz (1963; co-author Lauren Lynn Wagner)
The Moorchild
Master Cornhill (New York: Atheneum, 1973; reprinted Littleton, CO: Sonlight Curriculum, 1995)
The Rundelstone of Oz, 2000
The Forbidden Fountain of Oz (1980, co-author Lauren Lynn Wagner)
The Money Room
Crown Fire, Coward, 1951
Pharaoh (adult novel, set in Ancient Egypt), Coward, 1958 
"Techniques of Fiction Writing", Writer, 1959

References

External links 

Guide to the Eloise and William McGraw Papers 1923–1991 in the University of Oregon Libraries
An Evening With Eloise Jarvis McGraw
 
 

1915 births
2000 deaths
20th-century American novelists
American children's writers
American fantasy writers
American women novelists
American historical novelists
Writers of historical fiction set in antiquity
Women historical novelists
Newbery Honor winners
Edgar Award winners
Writers from Portland, Oregon
Women science fiction and fantasy writers
American women children's writers
20th-century American women writers
Novelists from Oregon
Oz (franchise)